Neecia Majolly is an Indian concert pianist, conductor, singer, teacher and composer.

Education
Majolly holds an ALS (Associate of La Salle - SIA College of the Arts, Singapore) in both performance and principles of teaching, ALCM (Associate of the London College of Music) in music theatre, LTCL (Licentiate of the Trinity College, London) in piano, voice and principles of teaching, LRSM (Licentiate of the Royal Schools of Music, London) in piano, and the FTCL (Fellowship of the Trinity College, London) in piano.

Music career
Majolly has several successful solo performances to her credit in Malaysia, Singapore, Western Australia, Brunei, Sweden, USA and India, and was an accompanist to Russian-American violinist Galina Heifetz in India. She has recorded for radio and television.

As a piano and celebrity vocal coach, Majolly has taught at the Delhi School of Music, the Bangalore School of Music, Technics Music School (Sabah, Malaysia), and teaches privately in Bangalore (including vocal training and interpretative workshops), where she has been living since 1995. Majolly was the Founder-Director and President of the Bangalore Society of Performing Arts (BSPA), and was the artistic adviser to the National Philharmonic of India. She also worked as radio presenter of Western Classical Music in New Delhi during the period 1993-94, as well as critiquing for two major newspapers, Deccan Herald as well as the Indian Express, during the period 1995-96. She is ex-All-Karnataka representative of the London College of Music Examinations(LCME).

Majolly is the Founder-Trustee of the Majolly Music Trust, which aims to raise the standard of Western Classical Music in India and has the unique distinction of having created a pension fund for aged and infirm musicians due to absence of any framework of social security in India.

Under her baton, two choirs, Madrigals, Etc which specializes in music from the Renaissance period and the Camerata, have earned a firm reputation in India for being unique in their choice of repertoire and quality of presentation. The year 2001 saw the historic performance of Handel's "Messiah" for choir, soloists and full-fledged orchestra, the likes of which had never been experienced in India before. The former choir launched, in October 2009, the first ever western classical music album in India The Renaissance Begins. She now has a piano album Gold Spa by Universal Audio, USA. 'Femusica',formed in 2019, is an all-women choir presenting music by only women composers which made their debut in Chennai in September 2019 that also included the world premiere of 'Haiku 1' for mezzo soprano and piano.

Awards
In 1992, Majolly was awarded the Stephanie Coleman Prize for Best Graduating Pianist from the Western Australian Conservatorium of Music, Perth, the Rex Hobcroft Award in 1991 for Best Pianist at the Inaugural Chamber Music Competition (Western Australian Conservatorium of Music, Perth), and in 2001, the Edgar Fewkes Memorial Award for outstanding musician (voice) in the southern Indian region. Her band 'The Majolly Project' won two Global Music Awards for their debut single 'Dark Room' in the 'Emerging Global Artist' and 'Best Song' categories. It has also been nominated for the IMEA Awards in the Rock Song of the Year category for Dark Room.

References

External links
Official site

Year of birth missing (living people)
Bruneian musicians
Living people
21st-century pianists
21st-century women pianists